Exportin-6 is a protein that in humans is encoded by the XPO6 gene.

Exportins, such as XPO6, recruit cargo in the nucleoplasm in the presence of Ran-GTP and form ternary export complexes. These complexes are transported through nuclear pore complexes to the cytoplasm, where GTP is hydrolyzed and the export complex is disassembled.

References

Further reading